Pachyderm may refer to:
 Any of the Pachydermata, an obsolete 19th-century taxonomic order of mammals that included elephants, rhinoceroses and hippopotami.
 Pachyderm Studio, a recording studio in Cannon Falls, Minnesota.
 Pachyderma, a skin condition.